The Dalby Herald is an online newspaper published in Dalby, Queensland, Australia.

History 
The newspaper has been published since 1865.

Along with many other regional Australian newspapers owned by NewsCorp, the newspaper ceased print editions in June 2020 and became an online-only publication from 26 June 2020.

Digitisation 
Issues from 1910 to 1954 have been digitised and available through Trove.

References

External links 
 
 
 

Dalby Herald
Dalby, Queensland
Online newspapers with defunct print editions
Publications established in 1865